Lambourn Woodlands is a hamlet in the English county of Berkshire. The parish is within the unitary authority of West Berkshire, close to the border between the counties of Berkshire and Wiltshire.

Geography
Lambourn Woodlands is located on the route of Ermin Way, the Roman road which connected Calleva Atrebatum (today's Silchester) to Glevum (Gloucester). The hamlet is in the triangle formed by the modern B4000 from Newbury to Lambourn and Hilldrop Lane. The former pub, the Hare and Hounds, is a Grade II listed building. The mast of the Membury transmitting station, adjacent to the service area, is visible from a considerable distance.

See also
 List of places in Berkshire
 Berkshire Downs

References

External links

 Royal Berkshire History: Lambourn Woodlands

Villages in Berkshire
Lambourn